Trevor Griffiths (born 4 April 1935, Ancoats, Manchester) is an English dramatist.

Early life and career
Brought up as a Roman Catholic, he attended St. Bede's College before being accepted into Manchester University in 1952 to read English. After a brief involvement with professional football and a year in national service, he became a teacher.

He became chairman of the Manchester Left Club, and the editor of the Labour Party's Northern Voice newspaper. Gradually he tired of political journalism, began writing plays, and was eventually commissioned by Tony Garnett to provide a script for The Wednesday Play (BBC, 1964–70). The play, "The Love Maniac", was about a teacher, but even though Garnett took the commission with him when he moved to London Weekend Television and formed Kestrel Productions, it was never produced.

Buoyed by Garnett's enthusiasm and influenced by the Paris events of May 1968, he wrote Occupations, a stage play about the Italian Communist Antonio Gramsci and the Fiat factory occupations of 1920s Italy. The play had been submitted to the Royal Shakespeare Company (RSC) as early as 1964, but had then been rejected as being "too controversial". Following its premiere in Manchester the previous year, the eventual RSC production in 1971 of Occupations, Griffiths first full-length stage play, was directed by Buzz Goodbody. Intending to affect "bourgeois theatre" with his viewpoint, Griffiths has described his approach as being "committed to analysing Marxism and to condemn Stalinism without discrediting socialism in the eyes of the world".

The play soon brought him to the attention of Kenneth Tynan, the literary manager of the National Theatre Company who promptly commissioned Griffiths to write the play that became The Party. This critique of the British revolutionary left featured the National's artistic director Laurence Olivier in his last stage role as the Glaswegian Trotskyist John Tagg. Griffiths had by now begun to write television plays, such as "All Good Men" (Play for Today, BBC, 31 January 1974) and "Through the Night" (2 December 1975). Influenced by the experience of his wife, the latter is concerned with a woman's treatment for breast cancer. In between these two plays came "Absolute Beginners" (BBC, 19 April 1974), in the series Fall of Eagles, which presents a version of events in 1903 involving Lenin and Trotsky. He developed a series about parliamentary democracy, Bill Brand, which was first shown by ITV in the summer of 1976.

Despite his considerable success in the theatre, he said of his work as a television dramatist in 1976: "I simply cannot understand socialist playwrights who do not devote most of their time to television... [t]hat if for every Sweeney that went out, a Bill Brand went out, there would be a real struggle for the popular imagination... [a]nd people would be free to make liberating choices about where reality lies."

In the meantime, Griffiths had continued to write for the theatre with Comedians commissioned by the Nottingham Playhouse. The premiere production of the play was directed by Richard Eyre, then artistic director of the Nottingham theatre, and was first performed on 20 February 1975. Comedians is set in a Manchester night-school, where a group of budding comics gather for a final briefing before performing to an agent from London. The play is set in real time, i.e. as the real time is 7.27, the clock on the wall of the school room also says 7.27. It subsequently transferred to Broadway, and was later adapted for television by Eyre while he was responsible for Play for Today.

1980s
Griffiths' reputation at the time was such that Warren Beatty asked him to write a screenplay for a project about the US revolutionary John Reed, which eventually became the Oscar-winning film Reds (1981), but Griffiths departed from the project before the script was completed and estimates that he had written only 45% of the script for the finished film.

Griffiths continued to work in the theatre, gaining success with the touring production of Oi for England (ITV, 17 April 1982). His television play, Country (BBC, 20 October 1981), set just before the Labour victory at the 1945 general election is "a not wholly unsympathetic study of a Tory family". He wrote the television serial, The Last Place on Earth (ITV, 1985), the screenplay for Fatherland (1986) for director Ken Loach, and the play Piano (1990), an adaptation of a film.

Later career
Griffiths's Food for Ravens (BBC, 15 November 1997), was commissioned to mark the 100th anniversary of Aneurin Bevan's birth, but at one point the BBC decided not to network the play, and instead restrict it to Wales. Only a newspaper campaign led by Griffiths and the leading actor Brian Cox caused the BBC to relent, and it was finally shown in a late-night slot on BBC2.

In November 2008 Griffiths participated in a discussion on "The Writer and Revolution" with the World Socialist Web Site's arts editor David Walsh at the University of Manchester. In 2009 he completed the play A New World: A Life of Thomas Paine.

He participated in the Bush Theatre's 2011 project Sixty-Six Books, for which he wrote a piece based on a book of the King James Bible.

References

External links
Trevor Griffiths website
Trevor Griffiths, BFI Screenonline
"Trevor Griffiths", British Council
Video: “The Writer and Revolution” Part 1
Ann Talbot, "Trevor Griffiths' These are the Times: a Life of Thomas Paine", World Socialist Web Site, 21 February 2008.

1935 births
Living people
Alumni of the Victoria University of Manchester
English dramatists and playwrights
English socialists
English male dramatists and playwrights
People from Ancoats
People educated at St Bede's College, Manchester
20th-century English male writers
21st-century English male writers